Correctional Institution for Women may refer to:
 Philippines
 Correctional Institution for Women (Mandaluyong) - Metro Manila
 United States
 Iowa Correctional Institution for Women
 North Carolina Correctional Institution for Women

See also:
 Kentucky Correctional Institute for Women
 Louisiana Correctional Institute for Women